Chamelaucieae is a tribe of flowering plants within the family Myrtaceae, mostly from Australia, with a few species in New Caledonia and south-east Asia.

Genera include:

Actinodium Schauer (Australia)
Aluta Rye & Trudgen (Australia)
Astartea DC. (Australia)
Astus Trudgen & Rye (Australia)
Babingtonia Lindl.  (Australia)
Baeckea L (Australia, South-East Asia)
Balaustion  Hook. (Australia)
Calytrix Labill. (Australia)
Chamelaucium Desf. (Australia)
Corynanthera J. W. Green (Australia)
Cyathostemon Turcz. (Australia)
Darwinia Rudge (Australia)
Enekbatus Trudgen & Rye (Australia)
Ericomyrtus Turcz. (Australia)
Euryomyrtus Schauer (Australia)
Harmogia Schauer (Australia)
Homalocalyx F. Muell. (Australia)
Homoranthus A. Cunn. ex Schauer (Australia) 
Hypocalymma (Endl.) Endl. (Australia) 
Kardomia Peter G. Wilson (Australia)
Malleostemon J. W. Green (Australia)
Micromyrtus Benth. (Australia)
Ochrosperma Trudgen (Australia)
Pileanthus Labill. (Australia)
Rinzia Schauer ((Australia)
Sannantha Peter G. Wilson (Australia, New Caledonia)
Scholtzia Schauer (Australia)
Stenostegia A.R. Bean (Australia)
Thryptomene Endl. (Australia)
Triplarina Raf. (Australia)
Verticordia DC. (Australia)

References

Myrtaceae
Rosid tribes